The ball-tailed cat (Felis caudaglobosa) is a fearsome critter of North American folklore most commonly described as having similar traits to that of a mountain lion, except with an exceedingly long tail to which there is affixed a solid, bulbous mass for striking its prey. Tales of ball-tailed cats were common among woodsmen during the turn of the 20th century and many variations exist; two of the more prominent variants are the digmaul and the sliver cat. The latter is distinguishable for not only having a smooth-sided ball for knocking wayfarers unconscious, but in addition a spiked-side for piercing and grappling its victims.

References

Fearsome critters
Mythological felines
Cat folklore